The Staffordshire Police, Fire and Crime Commissioner, formerly the Staffordshire Police and Crime Commissioner is the police, fire and crime commissioner (PFCC), an elected official tasked with setting out the way crime is tackled by Staffordshire Police and the way fire and rescue services are managed by Staffordshire Fire and Rescue Service, in the English county of Staffordshire. The post was created in November 2012, following an election held on 15 November 2012, and replaced the Staffordshire Police Authority. The incumbent, since 2021, is Ben Adams, who represents the Conservative Party.

Matthew Ellis was re-elected to serve another four-year term at the 2016 England and Wales police and crime commissioner elections.

From 1 August 2018, the Staffordshire Police and Crime Commissioner became responsible for the governance of the fire and rescue services within Staffordshire, under the Police, Fire and Crime Commissioner for Staffordshire (Fire and Rescue Authority) Order 2018. The Staffordshire Police and Crime Commissioner is formally known as the Staffordshire Commissioner Fire and Rescue Authority, when exercising powers relating to Staffordshire Fire and Rescue Service.

Matthew Ellis announced in June 2019 that he would not seek re-election at the 2020 England and Wales police and crime commissioner elections.

List of office holders

Election results

2021

2016

References

External links 

Police and crime commissioners in England